Maria Duchêne-Billiard (1884 – April 2, 1947) was a French contralto of the Metropolitan Opera from 1912 to 1916. She portrayed such roles as Amneris in Aida, Giulietta in The Tales of Hoffmann, Lola in Cavalleria rusticana, Maddalena in Rigoletto. She sang the role of the Old Woman in L'amore dei tre re, Rosette in Manon, Schwertleite in Die Walküre, and the Solo Madrigalist in Manon Lescaut among others.

Biography

Duchêne was born in France and arrived in the United States in 1907 at the age of 23, already calling herself an "artiste". In 1910, she created the role of Adah in Naughty Marietta on Broadway.

She made her debut at the Metropolitan Opera on March 16, 1912 as La Cieca in Amilcare Ponchielli's La Gioconda with Emmy Destinn in the title role, Enrico Caruso as Enzo, and Arturo Toscanini conducting. She appeared in the American premiere of  Boris Godunov as the Nurse in 1912 with Toscanini conducting. On March 12, 1913 she was to sing the role of Giulietta in Les Contes d'Hoffmann when she fainted; her role was taken over by madam Fremsted, who had sung the role when it premiered in the United States. 

With the company she notably portrayed the role of the Peasant Woman in the United States premiere of Gustave Charpentier's Julien on February 26, 1914. Her mother, Elizabeth Duchêne (1859–1915) died in 1915 of pneumonia just as Duchêne was about to take the stage as Lola in Cavalleria rusticana.
 
Her final and 166th performance with the Met was as Ulrica in Un ballo in maschera in an out-of-town performance at the Boston Opera House on April 18, 1916. 

On October 7, 19?? she married André Dumont (1896–1942), french harmonium maker at Les Andelys. On August 11, 1937, they divorced.

She died on April 2, 1947.

References

20th-century French women opera singers
Operatic contraltos
1884 births
1947 deaths